Balaban, or balaman ( – بالابان) is cylindrical-bore, double-reed wind instrument about  long with eight finger holes and one thumb hole. This instrument is played in the eastern part of Iran's historic Azerbaijan region as well as in the Republic of Azerbaijan (where it is also called Düdük according to the Encyclopædia Iranica). Balaban, Mey, and Duduk are almost identical, except for historical and geographical differences.  

Balaban can be made of mulberry or other harder woods, such as walnut. The double reed is made out of a single tube of cane about six cm long and pressed flat at one end. The performer uses air stored in his cheeks to keep playing the balaban while he inhales air into his lungs. This “circular” breathing technique is commonly used with all the double-reed instruments in the Middle East.

Balaban can be found in regions of the Republic of Azerbaijan, Iran and Turkey. It is sometimes used as Balaman, Mey or Whistle, among Azerbaijan and Turkistan in the West Azerbaijan region.

Consisting of a body (govda) and a mouth-worn flat reed mouthpiece, Balaban is 280-300 millimeters long and 20-22 millimeters in diameter. The sound is dull and light, and because it is weak, it is mostly played in closed spaces and room meetings. Thanks to the clamp on the reed, the sound can be thinned and thickened. The cane, flattened by a special method, consists of a clamp and a body. By pushing the grapple upwards or downwards on the reed, one-curtain sound change can be made and it can adapt to the instrument groups immediately.
According to Azerbaijani artist Hüseynqulu Sarabski, hunters steal balans and attract quails. Another type of Balaban is used in love music. Alihan Samedov is a famous Azerbaijani ballaban artist.

Structure
Balaban, which is often called also yasti (flat) balaban for flat mouthpiece and soft sound, consists of body made of apricot tree, cane, barrow and cover. The body has 8 holes on the surface and 1 on the back in the middle of the first and second holes (sound fret) on the surface. It consists of a stem, a reed, a regulator, and a cap.

The stem of the balaban, or govda, is a  cylindrical tube made primarily of apricot wood (sometimes hazel, pear, mulberry, boxwood, etc.). The process of carving a balaban stem is called balaban chakma. The upper end of the stem (bash or kup) is given a round shape, whereas the lower end (ayag) is sharpened. Sometimes an additional hole called  is made on the lower end of the bottom side to ensure good timbre.

The holes made on the stem are classified as follows:

The reed (or ) made of club-rush that grows in an arid area is inserted into the upper end. It flattens and takes the shape of a double reed. The reed is then fixed by a collar-like regulator on one side and a  pivot on the other side. The cap (band, etc.) made of willow, hazel, cornel or mulberry is put on the reed to prevent it from damage. It is tied to the regulator in order not to be lost.

History

In the region; Balaman is also called Yasla Balaman, flat Balaman.
 Balaman in Black Hearts.
Balaban first used in Azerbaijan orchestra since 1931, when the Folk Instrument Orchestra was established in Azerbaijan.
It is used to accompany songs in Turkmen and Kurdish cities such as Erbil, Süleymaniye, Kirkuk.
Balaban, which has a warm sonority, is often used as a companion to the songs of heaven and bendir and Aşık. Kudüm and defle can also perform a duet, and are also performed solo.
2 The balaban plays together, while someone gives a sound, and someone plays the melody.

Use
On solemn occasions such as weddings and holiday ceremonies, a balaban-player is accompanied by a percussionist. A traditional Azeri musical group consisting of two balaban-players and a percussionist is called . The short selection of Azerbaijani mugham played in balaban, national wind instrument was included on the Voyager Golden Record, attached to the Voyager spacecraft as representing world music, included among many cultural achievements of humanity. It was also used in pastoral songs and funeral music. According to Huseyngulu Sarabski, hunters played the balaban to attract quails. Certain types of the balaban are also used in ashik music.

Legacy
Kamil Jalilov's recording of the song with balaban was included on the Voyager Golden Record, attached to the Voyager spacecraft as representing mugham, only Azerbaijani song included among many cultural achievements of humanity.

Gallery

References

External links 
 
 Ch. Albright. BĀLĀBĀN. Iranica.
 Mey-Duduk-Balaban | Müzik Öğretmenleri Sitesi
 Balaban, Duduk and Mey (video)

Single oboes with cylindrical bore
Azerbaijani musical instruments
Azerbaijani inventions
Iranian inventions
Azerbaijani words and phrases
Iranian musical instruments